Stereocaulon arenarium is a species of snow lichen belonging to the family Stereocaulaceae.

Ecology
Stereocaulon arenarium is a known host to the lichenicolous fungus species Lasiosphaeriopsis stereocaulicola.

References

Stereocaulaceae
Lichen species
Taxa named by Vsevolod Savich
Lichens described in 1923